The 9th Iowa Cavalry Regiment was a cavalry regiment that served in the Union Army during the American Civil War.

Service
The 9th Iowa Cavalry was mustered into Federal service at Davenport, Iowa, for a three-year enlistment on November 30, 1863.

The regiment was mustered out of Federal service on March 23, 1866.

Total strength and casualties
A total of  1353 men served in the 9th Iowa at one time or another during its existence.
It suffered 19 enlisted men who were killed in action or who died of their wounds and 165 enlisted men who died of disease, for a total of 184 fatalities.

Commanders
 Colonel Mathew Mark Trumbull.

See also
List of Iowa Civil War Units
Iowa in the American Civil War

Notes

References
The Civil War Archive

Units and formations of the Union Army from Iowa
Military units and formations established in 1863
1863 establishments in Iowa
Military units and formations disestablished in 1866